The 2013 PBA Commissioner's Cup Finals was the best-of-5 championship series of the Philippine Basketball Association (PBA) 2013 Commissioner's Cup, and the conclusion of the conference's playoffs. The Alaska Aces and the Barangay Ginebra San Miguel competed for the 108th championship contested by the league. Alaska defeated Ginebra by sweeping the series, 3-0, with Alaska winning its first championship (14th overall) after Tim Cone's tenure with the Aces and their final title in the league.

This was the third time the two teams met in the finals, and served as a rematch of the 1997 edition of the Commissioner's Cup, when Barangay Ginebra, then known as the Gordon's Gin Boars defeated Alaska, four games to two.

Background

Road to the finals

Head-to-head matchup

Series summary

Game 1

Game 2

Game 3

Rosters

{| class="toccolours" style="font-size: 95%; width: 100%;"
|-
! colspan="2" style="background-color: #; color: #; text-align: center;" | Alaska Aces Commissioner's Cup roster
|- style="background-color:#; color: #; text-align: center;"
! Players !! Coaches
|-
| valign="top" |
{| class="sortable" style="background:transparent; margin:0px; width:100%;"
! Pos. !! # !! POB !! Name !! Height !! Weight !! !! College 
|-

{| class="toccolours" style="font-size: 95%; width: 100%;"
|-
! colspan="2" style="background-color: #; color: #; text-align: center;" | Barangay Ginebra San Miguel Commissioner's Cup roster
|- style="background-color:#; color: #; text-align: center;"
! Players !! Coaches
|-
| valign="top" |
{| class="sortable" style="background:transparent; margin:0px; width:100%;"
! Pos. !! # !! POB !! Name !! Height !! Weight !! !! College

Broadcast notes

Additional Game 3 crew:
Trophy presentation: Dominic Uy
Dugout celebration interviewer: Erika Padilla

References

External links
PBA official website

2012–13 PBA season
2013
Alaska Aces (PBA) games
Barangay Ginebra San Miguel games
PBA Commissioner's Cup Finals